The Palatine T 3 was a class of goods train tank locomotives with a C n2t wheel arrangement in service with the Palatinate Railway. They had no running axles. They were incorporated into the Deutsche Reichsbahn as DRG Class 891 with operating numbers 89 101–121. Their design was based on that of the Bavarian D V.

History 
Compared to other railway companies, the Palatinate Railway only procured C couplers for service on branch lines and shunting from 1889 to 1905. In Bavaria locomotives of Class C V had been in operation for 10 years.

Procurement 
Over a total of 16 years, the firm of Maffei acquired a total of 27 engines in four batches.  The first four machines - procured in 1889/1990 - were bought as replacements for engines that had been decommissioned and they were given their numbers. The next procurement series from 1898 for seven engines and the batch ordered from 1900 for eleven engines received new, sequential numbers. In the 1902 batch of a further four locomotives, there was another re-used of previous operating numbers. In 1905 another engine with a new, consecutive number was delivered.

All the engine were given names as well as operating numbers as was usual with the Palatinate Railways at that time.

Fate 
Twenty one units were taken over by the Deutsche Reichsbahn, who renamed them the Class 89.1 in their numbering scheme. In 1920, six locomotives - numbers 207, 208, 246, 252, 255 and 285 - had to be handed over to the Saarland Railways.

In a list of locomotives in the French occupation zone from 1948, eight engines are allotted to the EAW Kaiserslautern. The last unit was retired in 1953 from the Deutsche Bundesbahn.

Locomotive numbers 
Details of the individual engines and their numbering are as follows:

References

Literature 
 Mühl, Albert (1982). Die Pfalzbahn: Geschichte, Betrieb und Fahrzeuge der pfälzischen Eisenbahnen. Theiss. 252 pp.
 
 Heinz Schnabel: Deutsches Lok-Archiv: Lokomotiven bayrischer Eisenbahnen. transpress, Berlin 1992, ISBN 3-344-70717-5

0-6-0T locomotives
T 03
Railway locomotives introduced in 1889
Maffei locomotives
Standard gauge locomotives of Germany